Dipteronotus is an extinct genus of stem-neopterygian ray-finned fish that existed during the Triassic period in what is now Europe. As a typical feature, it had several ridge scales in front of its dorsal fin that created a spine-like structure.

See also

 Prehistoric fish
 List of prehistoric bony fish

References

External links
 Bony fish in the online Sepkoski Database

Prehistoric ray-finned fish genera
Triassic bony fish
Prehistoric neopterygii
Prehistoric fish of Africa
Triassic fish of Europe